Thunder is the debut studio album by supergroup S.M.V., consisted of bassists Stanley Clarke, Marcus Miller and Victor Wooten. It was released on August 12, 2008 via Heads Up International. Recording sessions took place at Hannibal Studio and Threshold Sound + Vision in Santa Monica, at House of Blues Studios in Encino, at Westlake Studios and Le Gonks West in Los Angeles, at VixMix Studios in Nashville, and at Ryan's Place in Topanga. The entire album was produced by Marcus Miller with co-production by Clarke and Wooten. It features contributions from Antoinette "Butterscotch" Clinton on vocals, George Duke, Ruslan Sirota, Ariel Mann, Chick Corea and Karlton Taylor on keyboards, Ronald Bruner Jr., Poogie Bell, Derico Watson and J. D. Blair on drums, Kevin Ricard on percussion, Michael "Patches" Stewart on trumpet, and Steve Baxter on trombone.

The album peaked at #186 on the Billboard 200 albums chart in the United States.

Track listing

Personnel
SMV
 William Henry Marcus Miller Jr. – bass guitar, fretless bass (track 7), bass clarinet (tracks: 1, 9), alto & tenor saxophone (track 1), synthesizers (tracks: 2-7, 9, 11, 13), minimoog (track 4), drum programming (tracks: 2, 6, 9), producer, recording
 Stanley Clarke – bass guitar (tracks: 1-6, 10-13), double bass (tracks: 7, 9), co-producer
 Victor Lemonte Wooten – bass guitar (tracks: 1-11, 13), co-producer, recording
Additional musicians
 Antoinette Clinton – vocals (tracks: 2, 9), beatboxing (tracks: 2, 11)
 George Duke – clavinet (track 3), minimoog (track 6)
 Ariel Mann – synthesizer (track 1)
 Ruslan Sirota – keyboards (track 1)
 Armando Anthony Corea – piano (track 4)
 Karlton Taylor – keyboards (track 9)
 Ronald Bruner Jr. – drums (tracks: 1, 10, 13)
 Charles Bell Jr. – drums (tracks: 5, 6)
 Derico Watson – drums (track 3)
 J. D. Blair – drums (track 9)
 Kevin Ricard – percussion (tracks: 4, 5, 7)
 Michael "Patches" Stewart – trumpet (tracks: 1, 6)
 Steve Baxter – trombone (tracks: 1, 6)
Technical
Gerry E. Brown – mixing & recording
Dave Rideau – mixing
David Isaac – mixing
Goh Hotoda – mixing
Peter A. Barker – additional recording
Erik Zobler – additional recording
Milton Gutiérrez Ruezga – assistant engineer
Antonio Resendiz – assistant engineer
Sharon Brencius – assistant engineer
Ursula Arevalo – assistant engineer
Scott Coslett – assistant engineer
Todd Bergman – assistant engineer
Doug Tyo – assistant engineer
Robert C. Ludwig – mastering
Steven Parke – art direction, design, photography
Danette Albetta – management
Bibi Green – management

Chart history

References

External links

2008 albums
Marcus Miller albums
Victor Wooten albums
Stanley Clarke albums
Heads Up International albums
Jazz-funk albums
Albums produced by Marcus Miller
Albums produced by Stanley Clarke